Physikalische Zeitschrift (English: Physical Journal) was a German scientific journal of physics published from 1899 to 1945 by S. Hirzel Verlag. In 1924, it merged with Jahrbuch der Radioaktivität und Elektronik. From 1944 onwards, the journal published the Reichsberichte für Physik (English: Reich Reports for Physics).

Several publications of great historical significance have been published in it, such as Albert Einstein's "Über die Entwicklung unserer Anschauungen über das Wesen und die Konstitution der Strahlung" (On the Development of Our Views Concerning the Nature and Constitution of Radiation) and Carl von Weizsäcker's work on the source of energy in stars. During its life, it was edited by several prominent physicists, such as Peter Debye.

Towards the end of its life, it was considered to represent "the more conservative elements within the German physics community", alongside Annalen der Physik.

See also
 Zeitschrift für Physik

References

External links

Index of freely available volumes
Some of the early volumes (before 1908) are available on Archive.org. Volumes from 1899 to 1923 are available on HathiTrust:, but some volumes are behind a paywall.

		

All volumes from 1 to 21 (1899–1920) are free available on Deutsche Digitale Bibliothek.

Physics journals
Publications established in 1899
Publications disestablished in 1945
German-language journals
Defunct journals